Pingasa chloroides is a moth of the family Geometridae first described by Anthony Galsworthy in 1998. It is found in China (Hong Kong, Fujian, Guangdong).

References

Moths described in 1998
Pseudoterpnini